Ziya-ur-Rahman Azmi (also written as Dhiya-ur-Rahman A'zamī; 1943 – 30 July 2020) was an Indian-born Saudi Arabian Islamic scholar who served as the Dean of the Department of Hadith at the Islamic University of Madinah. He is known for his compilation of hadith titled al-Jaami’ ul-kamil fi al-hadith al-sahih al-shamil.

Biography
Ziya-ur-Rahman Azmi was born Banke Laal into a Hindu Family in 1943 in Azamgarh. Aged 15, he embraced Islam in 1960. He received his primary education in a local school and then enrolled at the Shibli National College in Azamgarh. He began studying the traditional dars-e-nizami at the Jamia Darussalam in Oomerabad, and received a B.A. and an M.A. in Islamic studies from the Islamic University of Madinah and the Umm al-Qura University respectively. He wrote his doctoral thesis at the Al-Azhar University.

Azmi was appointed professor at the Islamic University of Madinah and was later awarded Saudi Arabian citizenship. He died on 30 July 2020.

Books
Azmi authored al-Jaami’ ul-kamil fi al-hadith al-sahih al-shamil, also known as Jami ul Kamil, a collection of sound hadith narrations. According to Islamic scholar Muhammad Ishaq Bhatti, "this is such a work that no one has done before."

Azmi collected and compiled all the available traditions from Abu Hurairah after an Egyptian hadith rejector Muhammad Aburiyah wrote Abū Hurayrah wa marwīyatih following in the footsteps of Goldziher. Azmi named the compilation as ''''Abū Hurayrah wa marwīyatih and wrote several detailed discourses in it defending the hadith. He gained access to rare manuscripts of Aqḍiyat Rasūl Allāh, a work by Andalusian Maliki scholar, Muḥammad ibn Faraj Ibn al-Ṭallā, who lived between 404 AH and 497 AH. Azmi studied these manuscripts and gave the general Islamic academia its access. His other works include:
 Abū Hurayrah fī ḍawʼ marwīyatih: dirāsah muqāranah fī miʼat ḥadīth min marwīyātih
 Dirāsāt fī al-jarḥ wa-al-taʻdīl
 al-Minnah al-kubrá: sharḥ wa-takhrīj al-Sunan al-ṣughrá lil-Ḥāfiẓ al-Bayhaqī
 Muʻjam muṣṭalaḥāt al-ḥadīth wa-laṭāʼif al-asānīd
 Dirāsāt fī al-Yahūdīyah wa-al-Masīḥīyah wa-adyān al-Hind
 al-Yahūdīyah wa-al-Masīḥīyah
 Fuṣūl fī adyān al-Hind: al-Hindūsīyah wa-al-Būdhīyah wa-al-Jaynīyah wa-al-Sīkhīyah wa-ʻalāqat al-taṣawwuf bi-hā
 Tahiyyat al-Masjid

References

Citations

Bibliography

Further reading
 
 

1943 births
2020 deaths
Islamic University of Madinah alumni
Al-Azhar University alumni
Converts to Islam
Converts to Islam from Hinduism
20th-century Indian Muslims
Islam in India
Indian expatriates in Saudi Arabia
Indian expatriates in Egypt
Umm al-Qura University alumni